Stampede Airport  is a public use airport located 25 nautical miles (29 mi, 46 km) northeast of the central business district of Kantishna, a community in the Denali Borough of the U.S. state of Alaska. The airport is located in the Denali National Park and Preserve and owned by the U.S. National Park Service.

Facilities and aircraft 
Stampede Airport has one runway designated 15/33 with a turf surface measuring 1,960 by 40 feet (597 x 12 m). In past years, the airstrip was 4,000 feet long but now about half is grown over with 10+ foot tall trees. For the 12-month period ending December 31, 2005, the airport had 30 aircraft operations, an average of 2 per month: 67% air taxi and 33% general aviation. The National Park Service has restricted this airstrip for commercial landings though it is open to private landings.

References

External links 
 Topographic map from USGS The National Map

Airports in Denali Borough, Alaska
National Park Service